Amrion is an Estonian film production company.

The company is founded in 2003 by Riina Sildos.

Filmography
 2013: "Viru. Vabaduse saatkond" (documentary film)
 2012: "Eestlanna Pariisis" (feature film)
 2013: "Kertu" (feature film)
 2014: "Ma ei tule tagasi" (feature film)
 2016: "Teesklejad" (feature film)
 2018: "Mihkel" (feature film)
 2018: "Seltsimees laps" (feature film)

References

Film production companies of Estonia